HMS Quantock was a Type I  destroyer of the Royal Navy which served in World War II. She was sold to Ecuador in 1954 where she served as Presidente Alfaro.

History in the Royal Navy
Quantock was ordered on 11 April 1939 under the 1939 War Emergency Build Programme. She was laid down as Job No. J112. She was commissioned in February 1941. She was adopted by the civil community of Ashton-under-Lyne in Lancashire as part of Warship Week in 1942.

She earned battle honours during the Second World War for North Sea 1941-1945, Atlantic 1943, Sicily 1943, Salerno 1943 and Adriatic 1944.

Following the war she was used as an air target training ship, before being transferred to the Reserve Fleet. She remained there until 1954 when she was sold to Ecuador, along with another Hunt-Class destroyer .

History in the Ecuadorian Navy
Following sale Quantock underwent a refit by J. Samuel White and Company, on the Isle of Wight, which was completed in 1955.

She was commissioned as Presidente Alfaro in August 1955 when she was taken over by the Ecuadorian Navy at Portsmouth Dockyard.

She served until 1978, when she was struck from the active list, before being sold for scrapping.

References

Publications

 

1940 ships
Hunt-class destroyers of the Royal Navy
Naval ships of Operation Neptune